Our Leading Citizen may refer to:

 Our Leading Citizen (1922 film), directed by Alfred E. Green
 Our Leading Citizen (1939 film), directed by Alfred Santell